Doyen Brus tram stop is located on ligne  of the tramway de Bordeaux, France.

Situation
The station is located on the avenue des Facultés in Pessac in the university area.

Junctions
There are no junctions with other tram lines or buses at this station.

Close by
 BEM - Bordeaux Ecole de Management
 CRPP
 ENSCPB
 ICMCB
 IECB
 ISTAB
 Université Bordeaux 1

See also
 TBC
 Tramway de Bordeaux

External links 
 

Bordeaux tramway stops
Tram stops in Pessac
Railway stations in France opened in 2004